7 Haight/Noriega is a bus route operated by the San Francisco Municipal Railway (Muni). It connects the central business district to the Outer Sunset via Haight-Ashbury.

Route description
From the Transbay Transit Center, buses run on Fremont Street to Market Street. The route runs on Market until turning off at Haight Street, which the 7 follows for its length. At Golden Gate Park, buses turn south on Stanyan then right on Lincoln. The inbound and outbound routes split to use 22nd and 23rd Avenues, respectively, until turning on Noriega. Buses loop around at the Great Highway and Ortega, terminating at 48th Avenue.

7X Noriega Express
The 7X Noriega Express is an express bus that serves the outer segment of the line with express service downtown. It diverts from the 7 between Lincoln and Market. The inbound terminus is the Ferry Terminal Plaza. The 7X was discontinued in 2020 amid the COVID-19 pandemic.

History
The 7 Haight and Ocean line extended to 49th and La Playa via Lincoln and a former Park & Ocean Railway right of way through Golden Gate Park. The line was truncated to 48th and Lincoln in 1947 after a bridge was deemed unsafe. Streetcar service ended on July 3, 1948, and the route was thereafter served by trolleybuses. 

By 1952, the 7 terminated at Golden Gate Park, effectively a short turn of the 71 Haight/Noriega and 72 Haight/Sunset which both continued further south and west. The 72 was discontinued in 1983, being partially replaced by the 29 Sunset. The 7 Haight was discontinued in 2009.

The 71 was renumbered to 7 in 2015. Rapid buses were discontinued in 2017 and replaced with local service.

References

External links

 7 Haight/Noriega — via SFMTA
 7 Haight Noriega Rapid Project

San Francisco Municipal Railway bus routes
Railway lines closed in 1948